Marilyn Agliotti (born 23 June 1979 in Boksburg, South Africa) is a field hockey player from the Netherlands, having previously represented South Africa. After her move to the Netherlands and award of a Dutch passport, she represented the Dutch national team. 

She was selected for the 2007 European Championships in Manchester where the Dutch won the silver medal. They won the bronze medal at the 2008 Champions Trophy in Mönchengladbach. She was a member of the Dutch team that qualified for the 2008 Summer Olympics in Beijing, and won the gold medal. She was also a member of the Dutch team that won the gold medal at the 2012 Summer Olympics.

Agliotti ended her international career in November 2012 but continued to train with local team Oranje Zwart. Tribute was given to her at the 2013 Rabobank Hockey World League championships.

Agliotti has been outspoken about being gay in sports. In an interview Agiolotti said the first thing she did after winning the gold medal at the 2008 games was “embrace my wife.” According to BuzzFeed she "spoke out for tolerance and acceptance in athletic competition after coming out publicly in 2011."

References

External links

1979 births
Living people
Dutch female field hockey players
People from Boksburg
Olympic field hockey players of South Africa
South African female field hockey players
Field hockey players at the 1998 Commonwealth Games
Field hockey players at the 2000 Summer Olympics
Commonwealth Games competitors for South Africa
Olympic field hockey players of the Netherlands
Field hockey players at the 2008 Summer Olympics
Medalists at the 2008 Summer Olympics
Field hockey players at the 2012 Summer Olympics
Medalists at the 2012 Summer Olympics
Olympic gold medalists for the Netherlands
Olympic medalists in field hockey
LGBT field hockey players
South African LGBT sportspeople
Dutch LGBT sportspeople
British female field hockey players
Sportspeople from Gauteng